Euchlaena irraria, the least-marked euchlaena, is a species of moth in the family Geometridae. It was first described by William Barnes and James Halliday McDunnough in 1916 and it is found in North America.

The MONA or Hodges number for Euchlaena irraria is 6739.

References

Further reading

 

Angeronini
Articles created by Qbugbot
Moths described in 1916